"Holy Holy" is a song by English singer-songwriter David Bowie, originally released as a single in January 1971. It was recorded in November 1970, after the completion of The Man Who Sold the World, in the perceived absence of a clear single from that album. Like Bowie's two previous singles, it sold poorly and failed to chart.

At the time Marc Bolan's Tyrannosaurus Rex was a significant source of inspiration for Bowie. On this track, according to NME editors Roy Carr and Charles Shaar Murray, "Bolan's influence is so much in the ascendant that it virtually amounts to a case of demonic possession". The single's B-side was another Tyrannosaurus Rex flavoured song called "Black Country Rock" from The Man Who Sold the World. Bowie performed "Holy Holy" on Britain's Granada Television wearing a dress, which he would also wear on the cover of the soon-to-be-released UK edition of The Man Who Sold the World.

A more energetic version of the song was recorded in late 1971 for The Rise and Fall of Ziggy Stardust and the Spiders from Mars. It was dropped from the album, but subsequently appeared as the B-side to "Diamond Dogs" in 1974. This version was also released as a bonus track on the Rykodisc reissue of The Man Who Sold the World in 1990 (despite the sleeve notes referring to it as the original cut), as well as on the Ziggy Stardust – 30th Anniversary Reissue bonus disc in 2002. Bowie himself vetoed the inclusion of the original at a late stage (in favour of the remake), and the single remained the only official release of the 1970 recording until 2015, when it was included on Re:Call 1, part of the Five Years (1969–1973) compilation.

Track listing
All tracks written by David Bowie.
1971 Mercury single
 "Holy Holy" – 3:13
 "Black Country Rock" – 3:05

1974 RCA single
 "Diamond Dogs" – 5:56
 "Holy Holy" – 2:20

Personnel
Credits according to biographer Chris O'Leary.
Original version
 David Bowie – vocals, acoustic guitar
 Alan Parker – lead guitar
 Herbie Flowers – bass, producer
 Barry Morgan – drums

Re-recorded version
 David Bowie – vocals
 Mick Ronson – lead and rhythm guitar
 Trevor Bolder – bass
 Woody Woodmansey – drums
 Ken Scott – producer

Notes

References

1971 singles
David Bowie songs
Songs written by David Bowie
Mercury Records singles
1970 songs